Christie Quincyna Quarcoopome also known in showbiz as Cina Soul is a Ghanaian singer-songwriter and recording artist. A finalist at the 2014 Vodafone Ghana Music Icons competition held in Accra, Ghana.

Early life
Christie Quincyna Quarcoopome was born and raised in Kokomlemle, Ghana, Accra to Ghanaian parents and hails from Jamestown in Accra. She is a native of the Ga Tribe of Ghana. Cina Soul had her Junior High school at Deyoungsters International School and Senior high school education at Aburi Girls Senior High School and continued to study psychology and archaeology at the University of Ghana. Cina is the second of three children, she has an older and younger sister all of whom are talented singers; a talent they might have inherited from their father.

Musical career

Early career 
Cina Soul's first attempt to music was her participation in the Vodafone Ghana Music Icons in 2014 and emerging as a finalist. After which we saw a series of mashups and covers of some mainstream songs including Mr Eazi's Bankulize and Cyna's Bamidele. In 2016, Cina released her debut album, 'Metanoia' featuring M.anifest, Worlasi and KiDi, the record that led her to the spotlight, earning her a spot on the charts with singles; Awo and Julor. Cina Soul was involved immensely in the Black Girls Glow Project which was launched in 2017 by Dzyadzorm and Poetra Asantewa. Alongside acts like Adomaa, Fu and Ria Boss, the group released their first album, Mother of Heirs in July 2017. Cina Soul performed at the Allianz Awards, the Goethe-Institut in December 2017 alongside Nana Yaa at the "Ghana Goes Germany", the Vodafone Ghana Music Awards in 2017. She also hosted her own concert, 'Metanoia X'.

Universal Music Group 
Earlier in 2018, Cina Soul released her first single after her EP, '00:01' which led to her being signed by the Universal Music Group. She released her second record this year, '12:01' under the new record label. She released her second record and debut single under the Universal Music imprint in August 2019, titled Adukwei. The song, produced by Nii Quaye, is performed in her local Ga dialect, was recorded ahead of the 2019 edition of the Homowo festival, a festival celebrated by the Ga people of Ghana.

Artistry
Cina Soul boasts of a diverse vocal range but settles within the genres of Soul, R&B, and Highlife music. Cina Soul's music is written and sung in both English and Ga. She admits most of her songs are derived from personal experiences.

Influences
Cina Soul's musical inspiration is derived strongly from Western influences. Her other musical influences are Anita Baker, Brandy, Sade, Aretha Franklin, Aṣa and Whitney Houston. She seeks artists with similar voice textures to hers and gleans from their experiences to enrich her own.

Discography

Videography

Awards and nominations

References

External links
 Cina Soul on Facebook

Living people
1996 births
Neo soul singers
21st-century Ghanaian women singers
21st-century Ghanaian singers
University of Ghana alumni
Alumni of Aburi Girls' Senior High School